The following is a list of transfers for the 2018 Major League Soccer season that have been made during the 2017–18 MLS offseason all the way through to the roster freeze on September 15, 2018.

Transfers

References

2018

Major League Soccer
Major League Soccer